The  is a science museum in Naka-no-shima, Kita-ku, Osaka, Japan. The museum is located between the Dōjima River and the Tosabori River, above Osaka's subterranean National Museum of Art. Opened in 1989, the museum was constructed to mark the 100th anniversary of Osaka City. The construction was funded through a 6.5 billion yen donation toward building costs from Kansai Electric. Its theme is "The Universe and Energy". Before the war a similar museum opened in 1937. It was known as the Osaka City Electricity Science Museum and it was both the first science museum and the first planetarium in Japan.

The Science Museum's primary permanent exhibition consists of four floors of mainly interactive science exhibits, totaling 200 items, with each floor focusing on a different theme. There is also a live science show with science demonstrations several times per day. Like the rest of the museum, these demonstrations are in Japanese only and visitors may require prior scientific knowledge to enjoy them.

The two secondary exhibits, both available separately from the primary exhibit, are a planetarium, which has a dome with a radius of 26.5 meters, the 7th largest in the world which projects the images of the heavens. In July 2004, the planetarium reopened after a renovation displaying the entire night sky as a next-generation digital image.

The museum also houses a collection of scientific resources, including 
Japan's first planetarium (a Carl Zeiss II model)
the Cockcroft-Walton accelerator 
resources related to Seimikyoku, Japan's first full-fledged chemistry laboratory
pre-war electrical measuring devices

Its collection of books and magazines for a general audience, largely on astronomy, is the most comprehensive in West Japan.

The science building is the place where Hideki Yukawa created his theory on mesons, for which he was awarded a Nobel prize. At the time this building was part of Osaka University. It was also the first place in Japan where radio waves from the universe were measured.

Construction history 
Founded— 1989
Completed— 1989
Design— Takenaka Corporation
Total floor area— 8,920.79m²
Address— 4-2-1, Naka-no-shima, Kita-ku, Osaka-shi, Osaka-fu 530-0005

Curatorial History
Tadao Nakano (first curator, former Osaka City University professor)
Noriaki Takahashi (former Osaka University professor)
Kenichi Kato (former)
Yoshihiko Saito(current)

Hours of operation
The Science Museum's official hours of operation are 9:30am to 5:00pm. It is closed on Mondays, but makes exceptions for national holidays. It is also closed for maintenance between December 28 and January 4.

Transport access
Keihan Electric Railway Nakanoshima Line Watanabebashi Station — Around 300m west
Osaka Municipal Subway Yotsubashi Line Higobashi Station — Around 500m west
Hanshin Electric Railway Main Line Fukushima Station — Around 800m south
West Japan Railway Company JR Tōzai Line Shin-Fukushima Station — Around 800m south
Osaka Municipal Subway Midosuji Line and Keihan Electric Railway Keihan Line Yodoyabashi Station — Around 900m west
West Japan Railway Company Osaka Loop Line Fukushima Station — Around 900m south
Osaka Municipal Bus Taminobashi stop
10 minutes from Osaka Station on Route 53 or 75
Osaka Municipal Bus Tosabori Itchōme stop
10 minutes from Osaka Station on Route 88
5 minutes from Yodoyabashi Station on Route 88
Hokko Kanko Bus Osaka Science Museum / the National Museum of Art, Osaka stop
10 minutes from Yodoyabashi Station on Nakanoshima Loop Bus
Hanshin Expressway Nakanoshima-nishi Exit / Tosabori Exit / Fukushima Exit

Information on the surrounding area

National Museum of Art, Osaka
Kansai Electric
United Church of Christ in Japan Osaka Church
Daibiru
Rihga Royal Hotel
Osaka International Convention Center
Museum of Oriental Ceramics, Osaka
Osaka Nakano-shima Government Building

Related items
Gakutensoku
OSTEC Exhibition Hall

Sources
Much of this article was translated from the equivalent article in the Japanese Wikipedia, as retrieved on November 22, 2006.

External links

 Official website(Japanese:ja:日本語)
 Official website(PDF file)

Nakanoshima
Museums in Osaka
Science museums in Japan
Osaka University history
Museums established in 1989
1989 establishments in Japan